Colégio Marista Arquidiocesano is a school located at Vila Mariana, a subcity of São Paulo, Brazil.

It was founded in 1858 and by 1908 the Maristas started teaching there.

Until 1935 it was located at Tiradentes Avenue, subcity of Luz. By January, 25th, it was opened at the new building, which had started in 1929.

In 1972 it opened to female students.

There is a language center, and an aquatic center complex in the new building finished by 2000.
Also, they are well known to give the butique, according to students.

Notable alumni
 Venceslau Brás
 Jânio Quadros
 Mariana Ximenes
 Rodrigo Faro

References and external Links
https://web.archive.org/web/20110505152926/http://www.marista.org.br/marista-arquidiocesano-o-colegio/D119
http://www.marista.org.br

Schools in São Paulo
Private schools in Brazil
Educational institutions established in 1858
1858 establishments in Brazil